Simone Alexandria Lee (born September 7, 1996) is an American volleyball player. She plays as an outside hitter for German professional team Allianz MTV Stuttgart.

Career

College
Simone Lee played for Penn State University from 2014 to 2017, taking the national title during her freshman year, reaching another Final 4 during her senior year.

U.S. national team

She made her debut in the United States senior national team at the 2018 Pan American Volleyball Cup, where she won the gold medal, and in 2019 at the FIVB Volleyball Nations League.

Professional
In December 2017, she signed her first professional contract with Imoco Volley, where she played the remainder of the 2017-18 season, winning the Scudetto. In the following season she played in the Turkish Sultanlar Ligi with Beylikdüzü Vİ.

In the 2019-20 season, she went to Japan, where she participated in the V.League Division 1 with the Kurobe AquaFairies; at the end of the commitments with the Asian team, she played in Germany for the final of the 1. Bundesliga with MTV Stuttgart. In the following season she returned to the Kurobe club, while in the 2021-22 season she plays again for Stuttgart.

References 

Living people
1996 births
American women's volleyball players
Sportspeople from Milwaukee
Outside hitters
Penn State Nittany Lions women's volleyball players
American expatriate sportspeople in Germany
American expatriate sportspeople in Turkey
American expatriate sportspeople in Italy
American expatriate sportspeople in Japan
Expatriate volleyball players in Germany
Expatriate volleyball players in Turkey
Expatriate volleyball players in Italy
Expatriate volleyball players in Japan
Serie A1 (women's volleyball) players